Sarandë District was one of the 36 districts of Albania, which were dissolved in July 2000 and replaced by 12 newly created counties. The centre of the district was the city of Sarandë. Other places included Konispol (at the border with Greece), Ksamil (a resort), Çukë, Vrinë and Butrint (an archeological site). Its territory is now part of Vlorë County: the municipalities of Sarandë, Konispol, Finiq (partly) and Himara (partly).

Alongside ethnic Albanians, there is a considerable ethnic Greek minority. As of 2002, less than 30% of the inhabitants of the district were Greeks.

Administrative divisions
The district consisted of the following municipalities:

Aliko
Dhivër
Konispol
Ksamil
Livadhe
Lukovë
Markat
Sarandë
Xarrë

Communities and settlements
Sarandë
Shkallë
Mursi
Vrinë
Xarrë
Vervë
Leshnicë e Poshtme

References

Further reading

Districts of Albania
Geography of Vlorë County